Nothaphoebe kingiana is a species of plant in the family Lauraceae. It is native to Peninsular Malaysia and Borneo.

References

kingiana
Flora of Peninsular Malaysia
Flora of Borneo
Taxonomy articles created by Polbot